Vaincre à Olympie is a French TV film from 1977. It was directed by Michel Subiela written by Maurice Genevoix, starring Thierry Dufour and Jean Marais. The scenario was based on a novel of Maurice Genevoix.

Cast 
 Thierry Dufour : Sostratos
 Jean Marais : Menesthée
 Panos Mihalopoulos : Euthymos
 Myrto Parashi : Pasithéa
 Georges Marchal : Milon de Crotone
 Jean Topart : Hérodore
 Jean Martinelli : Eukheiros
 Marie Lebée : Cymothoé
 Alexandros Goldfis : Théagène
 Vassilis Tsimbidis : Iphidamas

References

External links 
 

1977 television films
1977 films
French television films
1970s French-language films
Films set in ancient Greece
Films set in the 6th century BC
Films set in the 5th century BC
Films about the ancient Olympic Games
Films based on French novels
1970s French films